FC Cienfuegos is a Cuban football team playing in the Cuban National Football League and representing Cienfuegos Province. They play their home games at the Estadio Luis Pérez Lozano in Cienfuegos.

History
Nicknamed Los Marineros (the Sailormen), the team won 4 league titles, the most recent one in 2009.

Honours
Campeonato Nacional de Fútbol de Cuba: 4
 1985, 1990, 2008, 2009

Current squad
2018 Season

References

Cienfuegos
Cienfuegos
Association football clubs established in 1978
1978 establishments in Cuba